Baxter College is a mixed secondary school with academy status located in Kidderminster, Worcestershire, England. Prior to September 2002 the school was known as Harry Cheshire High School. The school provides education for pupils aged  11 to 18 years, and offers a wide range of courses at GCSE and A-Level.

History
The school was previously known as Harry Cheshire High School.  Due to a lack of good exam results and absence levels of up to 15% the school was placed under special measures by the Office for Standards in Education. In September 2002 it then became Baxter College.  Its results have greatly improved, and it has attained specialist status as a Business and Enterprise College.

The school has been paired with Stourport High School in a Leading Edge Partnership to assist in the improvement of the school.

Notable alumni
Justin Tomlinson, Member of Parliament for North Swindon

References

Secondary schools in Worcestershire
Academies in Worcestershire